The Foundation for Individual Rights and Expression (FIRE), formerly known as the Foundation for Individual Rights in Education, is a non-profit civil liberties group founded in 1999 with the aim of protecting free speech rights on college campuses in the United States. FIRE was renamed in June 2022, with its focus broadened to speech rights in American society in general.

Overview
The Foundation for Individual Rights in Education was co-founded by Alan Charles Kors and Harvey Silverglate in 1999, who were FIRE's co-directors until 2004. Kors and Silverglate had co-authored a 1998 book opposing censorship at colleges. Silverglate had served on the board of the American Civil Liberties Union (ACLU) of Massachusetts. Kors served as FIRE's first president and chairperson. Its first executive director and, later, CEO, was Thor Halvorssen. It was founded to be non-ideological and nonpartisan.

FIRE aims to defend First Amendment rights in academia, and files lawsuits against colleges and universities that it perceives as curtailing rights of students and professors. According to The New York Times journalist Cecilia Capuzzi Simon, "There are other groups that fight for First Amendment rights on campus, but none as vocal—or pushy—as FIRE." The Times also referred to FIRE as a "familiar irritant to college administrators" and said FIRE "bristles at the right-wing tag often applied to them". Cathy Young, a Cato Institute fellow and columnist for The Bulwark, wrote that "FIRE has handled many cases involving speech suppression in the name of progressive values," while also saying "it is that rare group which actually means it when it claims to be nonpartisan." Tim Urban wrote in his 2023 book What’s Our Problem? that “FIRE is politically neutral and regularly criticizes illiberal behavior by the Right as well as the Left.”

FIRE has received major funding from groups which primarily support conservative and libertarian causes, including the Bradley Foundation, Sarah Scaife Foundation, and the Charles Koch Institute. Among its other donors is the Hugh M. Hefner Foundation. FIRE has been described as a competitor of the larger ACLU. In 2021, the organization had an annual revenue of $16.1 million.

In June 2022, FIRE announced it was expanding its efforts beyond college campuses, to American society in  It was renamed Foundation for Individual Rights and Expression, keeping the acronym FIRE. It detailed a $75 million expansion plan over three years to focus on "litigation, public education, and research," with $10 million for a nationwide advertising campaign. Josh Gerstein wrote in Politico that "part of the push may challenge the American Civil Liberties Union's primacy as a defender of free speech." Politico also wrote that FIRE would spend $10 million on "planned national cable and billboard advertising featuring activists on both ends of the political spectrum extolling the virtues of free speech."

Organization 
FIRE is headquartered in Philadelphia, Pennsylvania, with another office in Washington, D.C.

Greg Lukianoff serves as president and CEO; Robert Shibley previously served as executive director. Nico Perrino is executive vice president. Lukianoff and Perrino have written in support of "the right to speak even the thoughts we hate". 

Lukianoff co-wrote The New York Times bestselling book The Coddling of the American Mind with New York University Professor Jonathan Haidt, arguing that tribalism on college campuses is a "very serious problem for any democracy." Ira Glasser, former executive director of the American Civil Liberties Union (ACLU), serves on FIRE's Advisory Council. Former ACLU President Nadine Strossen is also an advisory board member.

Policy positions

Campus speech 
FIRE rates colleges with a red, yellow, or green light based on its assessments of speech restrictions, with a red light meaning that a college policy "both clearly and substantially restricts freedom of speech." FIRE's percentage of colleges with "red light" speech codes increased in 2022 for the first time in 15 years. In 2007, Jon B. Gould, an author and George Mason University faculty member, criticized FIRE's rating methods, arguing that FIRE had exaggerated the prevalence of unconstitutional speech codes. 

FIRE has challenged "free speech zones" on college campuses, claiming they are unconstitutional restrictions on First Amendment rights. The organization has provided legal support to students contesting free speech zones, while also supporting legislation to eliminate such zones. In his book Speech Out of Doors: Preserving First Amendment Liberties in Public Places (Cambridge University Press, 2008), law professor Timothy Zick wrote "in large part due to [FIRE's] litigation and other advocacy efforts, campus expressive zoning policies have been highlighted, altered, and in a number of cases repealed."

Challenges to college residence life programs 
In 2007, the organization said that a mandatory program for students living in dormitories at the University of Delaware resembled "thought reform." The school suspended it.

Student press 
At the University of Wisconsin-Oshkosh, FIRE opposed university practices that required student journalists to submit their questions ahead of time or seek permission from the school before interviewing university employees. After FIRE intervened, the university revised its practices to no longer require prior approval before interviews.

Campus security fees 
FIRE has opposed security fees some campuses charge to groups which host controversial speakers. These fees are charged to pay for extra security, which colleges say is necessary due to the likelihood of demonstrations and disruption of events.

In 2014, FIRE assisted the Kalamazoo Peace Center in its lawsuit against Western Michigan University, after the university said the peace center could only invite rapper Boots Riley to speak on campus if it paid a security fee. The school settled the lawsuit and agreed to revise its policies.

Due process 
FIRE also targets situations where students and faculty are adjudicated outside the bounds of due process afforded to them by Constitutional law or stated university policy.

FIRE has argued for more rights for students facing sexual assault allegations. In 2011, FIRE opposed the Education Department's "Dear Colleague" letter that urged universities to use a "preponderance of the evidence" standard instead of the criminal justice system's "beyond a reasonable doubt" standard in sexual assault cases. In 2020, FIRE supported new rules made by the Department of Education during the Trump administration about sexual assault and harassment cases that required colleges to allow the cross-examination of accusers.

Public and private universities 
FIRE has argued that public schools are required to uphold First Amendment protections for their students and faculty members because they are government entities. Although private schools are not bound by the First Amendment, FIRE has said contractual promises related to free speech or academic freedom should be upheld.

In 2021, in response to the board of trustees at the University of North Carolina at Chapel Hill declining to give Nikole Hannah-Jones tenure, FIRE released a statement saying "if it is accurate that this refusal was the result of viewpoint discrimination against Hannah-Jones, particularly based on political opposition to her appointment, this decision has disturbing implications for academic freedom."

Cases

Public universities
FIRE joined with a number of other civil liberties groups in the case of Hosty v. Carter, involving suppression of a student newspaper at Governors State University in Illinois, and has been involved in a case at Arizona State University where it condemned the listing of certain sections of a class as open only to Native American students.

FIRE sparred with the University of New Hampshire in 2004 over its treatment of student Timothy Garneau, who was expelled from student housing after he wrote and distributed a flier joking that female classmates could lose the "freshman fifteen" by taking the stairs instead of the elevator. After FIRE publicly criticized the decision, Garneau was reinstated.

In May 2007, Valdosta State University expelled T. Hayden Barnes, who had protested against the construction of two new parking garages on the campus which he saw as encouraging the use of private transportation. University president Ronald Zaccari misconstrued a caption of the proposed garages as the "Ronald Zaccari Memorial Parking Garage" as a threat to himself. With FIRE support, the expulsion was overturned and a court found VSU to have violated Barnes's due process rights.

In 2008, college professor Kerry Laird was ordered by Temple College to remove the quote, "Gott ist tot" (God is Dead), a famous quote from Nietzsche, from his office door. FIRE wrote a letter to the Temple administration hinting at the possibility of legal action.

In October 2011, Catawba Valley Community College suspended a student (Marc Bechtol) for complaining on Facebook about a new policy that required students to sign up for a debit card to get their student ID and grant money. CVCC decided that the comments were "disturbing" and a "threat", and used that reasoning to suspend the student. FIRE took the side of the student.  Charges were dropped in December 2011.

In 2012, FIRE filed a lawsuit against Iowa State University (ISU) after ISU prevented the university's chapter of the National Organization for the Reform of Marijuana Laws from designing T-shirts featuring the school's mascot. The lawsuit eventually ended with nearly $1 million in damages and fees awarded.

In 2014, FIRE sued Chicago State University (CSU) for trying to shut down a faculty blog critical of CSU's former administration. The school eventually agreed to rewrite its speech policies, paying $650,000 to settle the lawsuit.

In 2021, FIRE filed a First Amendment lawsuit on behalf of an Eastern Virginia Medical School student who said his free speech rights were violated when the school denied recognition to a club that he was trying to establish because it supported universal health care. In March 2022, the school settled the lawsuit. Later that year, the organization helped University of Washington professor Stuart Reges take action against the school after it recommended that he include a Native American “land acknowledgment” on his course syllabus. FIRE is also representing conservative students at California-based Clovis Community College, where school administrators reportedly removed the students' anti-communism flyers from campus bulletin boards.

In September 2022, FIRE announced a lawsuit challenging Florida’s "Stop Woke Act", arguing that the bill unconstitutionally suppresses certain discussions of race and sex on college campuses. That November, a federal judge considering lawsuits by FIRE and the ACLU stopped enforcement of the higher education portions of the law, calling them “positively dystopian" and ruling that the law violates the rights of university students and faculty members. New York Magazine’s Jonathan Chait wrote that, while FIRE “has stood up against speech restriction from both the right and the left," it was notable that “the most effective opponent of left-wing political correctness” had led the effort against Florida Governor Ron DeSantis’ “signature campus law.”

Private universities
FIRE has criticized Columbia University's sexual misconduct policy; according to FIRE, the policy "lack[ed] even the most minimal safeguards and fundamental principles of fairness". The criticism led to the resignation of Charlene Allen, Columbia's program coordinator for the Office of Sexual Misconduct Prevention and Education, whose policies were at the center of the controversy.

FIRE criticized Brandeis University on both free speech and due process grounds in early 2008 over its treatment of veteran politics professor Donald Hindley. Provost Marty Krauss informed Hindley in October 2007 that comments he made in his Latin American politics class violated the school's anti-harassment policy. Krauss placed a monitor in Hindley's class and ordered him to attend racial sensitivity training. FIRE, along with Brandeis' own Committee on Faculty Rights and Responsibilities, criticized Krauss for never explicitly telling Hindley what specific in-class comments constituted harassing speech and for not granting Hindley a process by which to appeal the decision. According to Brandeis's student press, Hindley was rumored to have used the epithet "wetback". An anonymous student-witness, quoted in the Brandeis Hoot, called Hindley's remarks "inappropriate." Other students praised Hindley's pedagogical approach as encouraging "students to face racist narratives head on" and that any disagreement "is a dispute for students and faculty to solve through rational dialogue, not one for the administration to settle in secret inquisitions."

In 2015, FIRE defended Erika Christakis, associate master of Yale University's Silliman College, after she questioned the school's Intercultural Affairs Council for highlighting the cultural implications of Halloween costumes. Lukianoff recorded a video of students confronting Christakis's husband, who served as master of Silliman College, on the Yale campus.

In 2021, FIRE advocated on behalf of Stanford University student Nicholas Wallace, who satirized the Federalist Society and Republican political figures in an email to his peers. Wallace's diploma was initially put on hold for the email, prompting FIRE to contact Stanford in his defense. The school's investigation was ultimately dropped and Wallace was allowed to graduate.

In 2022, FIRE released a series of advertisements in Boston, Massachusetts, accusing Emerson College of censoring free speech on campus. The ad campaign came in response to Emerson investigating and suspending the campus chapter of Turning Point USA, which distributed stickers featuring a hammer and sickle with the caption "China Kinda Sus" (slang for "suspicious"). Emerson claimed the stickers represented "anti-China hate", while FIRE blamed the school for violating "freedom of expression". FIRE also launched the website "Emerson Kinda Sus" in response.

Off-campus 
In August 2022, FIRE defended the nonprofit group NeuroClastic, which had been threatened with a defamation lawsuit by the Judge Rotenberg Educational Center after criticizing the Center's use of electro-shock devices. That month, FIRE challenged the New York State Senate’s practice of blocking critics on Twitter, representing a resident who had criticized gun control legislation.

FIRE filed a lawsuit in December 2022 on behalf of First Amendment scholar Eugene Volokh and online platforms Rumble and Locals, challenging a New York state law that requires social networks to police hate speech on their platforms. Writing in The Wall Street Journal after the lawsuit was filed, Volokh claimed, “I don’t want to moderate such content and I don’t endorse the state’s definition of hate speech.” In February 2023, a federal judge blocked the law, writing that it “chills the constitutionally protected speech of social media users, without articulating a compelling governmental interest or ensuring that the law is narrowly tailored to that goal.”

Media, advertising, and sponsorships 
Since 2011, FIRE has published a list of the "worst colleges for free speech."

Since 2016, FIRE has produced "So to Speak: The Free Speech Podcast," hosted by Perrino. FIRE partnered with Korchula Productions and the DKT Liberty Project to produce Can We Take a Joke?, a documentary released in 2016 about comedy and speech.

In 2017, FIRE was listed as one of the sponsors of the conservative campus group Turning Point USA's Student Action Summit, according to tax records.

In 2020, FIRE partnered with College Pulse and RealClearEducation to release the College Free Speech Rankings, a comparison of student free-speech environments at America's top college campuses. That year, FIRE also released Mighty Ira, a documentary about Glasser.

In February 2022, FIRE produced an advertisement featuring National Basketball Association (NBA) player Enes Kanter Freedom for the 2022 Winter Olympics in China, supporting freedom of speech. Freedom also shared his personal story about censorship in his home country of Turkey.

See also
 Heterodox Academy
 Urofsky v. Gilmore

References

External links
 
 Organizational Profile – National Center for Charitable Statistics (Urban Institute)

Freedom of expression organizations
Civil liberties advocacy groups in the United States
Public education in the United States
Organizations established in 1999
Government watchdog groups in the United States
1999 establishments in Pennsylvania